Vibrissovoria is a genus of parasitic flies in the family Tachinidae. There are at least two described species in Vibrissovoria.

Species
These two species belong to the genus Vibrissovoria:
 Vibrissovoria aurea Townsend, 1929
 Vibrissovoria petiolata Townsend, 1919

References

Further reading

 
 
 
 

Tachinidae
Articles created by Qbugbot